The Battle of Tabarka was a military engagement fought between the forces of the Umayyad Caliphate and Dihya, a Berber queen. The battle took place near the city of Tabarka, Tunisia, in either 701, 702 or 703 AD. The battle resulted in a major victory for the Umayyads and the end of organized Berber resistance to the caliphate.

Background 
During the late 7th century, forces of the Arab-dominated Umayyad Caliphate conducted a decades-long conquest of the Magrheb, then under the nominal control of the Byzantine Empire. One major obstacle to the invasion was Dihya, a Berber queen who had fought against the Umayyad advance into Numidia. In 698, she won a victory over the Umayyads at the Battle of Meskiana, temporarily halting Hassan ibn al-Nu'man's campaign to conquer Numidia.

Battle
Regrouping in Libya, the Umayyads invaded Numidia again in either 701, 702 or 703. Dihya gathered many Berber tribes people to resist the new invasion. The two armies clashed near the town of Tabarka near the modern Algeria–Tunisia border, where a choke point exists between the Mediterranean sea and the Aurès Mountains. The battle - described as "fierce" - ended in a victory for the Umayyads, the death of Dihya, and the end of organized Berber resistance to the Umayyad invasion.

Aftermath
Dihya was later killed in Bir al-Kahina (al-Kâhina's well), Aurès. Sources disagree on whether Dihya's two sons - both of whom survived the battle - converted to Islam before the battle and fought against their mother or converted after the battle in exchange for their lives being spared.

References 

700s in the Umayyad Caliphate
Battles involving the Umayyad Caliphate
8th century in Africa
Muslim conquest of the Maghreb